Ichabod Charles Wright (11 April 1795 – 14 October 1871) was an English scholar, translator, poet and accountant. He is best known for his translation of important works of Italian literature, notably the works of Dante's Divine Comedy.

Biography
He was born in Mapperley Hall in 1795, the first child of Ichabod Wright (1767–1862) and Harriet Maria Day (d.1843) and the eldest of their three sons and ten daughters. The grandfather of Ichabod Snr., another Ichabod Wright (1700–1777), was an ironmonger who founded a bank in Long Row, Nottinghamshire in 1761. He was a second cousin of industrialist and philanthropist Francis Wright.

Wright studied at Eton College (1808–14) and pursued further education in Christ Church, Oxford, graduating with second-class BA honours in 1817 and MA in 1820, holding an open fellowship at Magdalen College, Oxford, from 1819 to 1825. 
In 1825, he joined his father in the banking profession and shortly after he began working he married Theodosia (1806–1895) on 21 December 1825, the daughter of Thomas Denman, the first Lord Denman, who later became Lord Chief Justice of England.

Wright indulged in much scholarly study alongside his profession and in the 1830s developed a passion for Italian literature and a thirst for the language. He translated the works of Dante, notably Divina commedia in three instalments,  Inferno, Purgatorio, and Paradiso, which earned him critical acclaim. 
These were published by Messrs. Longmans in 1833, 1836, and 1840 respectively and reprinted in a second edition in 1845. They were dedicated respectively to Lord Brougham, Archbishop Howley, and his father-in-law Lord Denman who also shared an interest in Italian literature.

He proceeded to publish works related to his profession and in 1841 he published Thoughts on Currency, and in 1847, Evils of the Currency. In 1855 he published The War and our Resources,  and in 1865 he published a translation of the Iliad of Homer in blank verse, translated between 1859 and 1864. In 1864 he wrote A letter to the Dean of Canterbury, on the Homeric lectures of Matthew Arnold; Matthew Arnold was a distinguished professor of poetry at the University of Oxford. His final work A Selection of Psalms in Verse was written in 1867, although many of his poems were printed privately after his death in 1873.

Ichabod Charles Wright died on 14 October 1871 at Heathfield Hall, Burwash, Sussex. He had resided in Stapleford Hall but died in the home of his eldest son, Charles Ichabod Wright (born 1828),  a politician and Conservative Party MP.

External links
 Archival material at

References

1795 births
1871 deaths
Wright family of Nottingham
English accountants
English translators
People from Nottingham
People educated at Eton College
Fellows of Magdalen College, Oxford
Alumni of Christ Church, Oxford
19th-century British translators
People from Stapleford, Nottinghamshire
Translators of Dante Alighieri
Translators of Homer
19th-century English businesspeople